The Unmasked Tour was a concert tour by the American hard rock band Kiss. It was the first tour not to feature original drummer Peter Criss, and the touring debut of his replacement Eric Carr.

Background 
The Unmasked tour was the first time that Kiss only played in Europe, Australia, and New Zealand, with only one show played in the United States, at the Palladium Theatre in New York. "Cold Gin" returned to the set for the first time since the Rock & Roll Over Tour, and featured Ace Frehley on lead vocals, rather than Simmons who had sung the song on all previous tours on which it was performed. "You're All That I Want" was performed briefly, but was quickly dropped. "Strutter", which had not been performed live since the Destroyer Tour, returned to the set as well. Iron Maiden were the opening act for the European leg of the tour. 
British heavy rock band Girl supported Kiss at Stafford, Bingley Hall. During an autograph session from the band while on tour in West Germany, more than 2,000 fans in Frankfurt ended up causing severe traffic jams. The West Germany concerts would bring in a total of 100,000 fans. The stage show and costumes, with the exception of Carr and Stanley, were holdovers from the Dynasty Tour.

This would be the last tour that Ace Frehley would perform with Kiss until the 1996 reunion tour.

In the tour program for the band's final tour, Stanley reflected on the tour:

Reception 
Roman Kozak, a reviewer from the magazine Billboard gave the performance a positive review. He opened his review, noting of the lineup changes with the introduction of the new drummer Eric Carr. Regarding the show, he acknowledged the performance as the typical Kiss show, but noted that the band were performing on a smaller stage than usual, with the performance being basically the same, with the inclusion of loud musical energy, special effects and lighting. He cited the change in the band's sound being more "melodic" and "pop-side", but still gave the fans the hard rock and heavy metal they wanted, taking note that the song "Talk to Me" was well-received by the audience.

Setlist 
"Detroit Rock City"
"Cold Gin"
"Strutter"
"Calling Dr. Love"
"Firehouse"
"Talk to Me"
"Is That You?"
"2,000 Man"
"I Was Made for Lovin' You"
"New York Groove"
"Love Gun"
"God of Thunder"
"Rock and Roll All Nite"
Encore
"Shout It Out Loud"
"King of the Night Time World"
"Black Diamond"

"You're All That I Want" was played until Nuremberg show.
"Shandi" was added as the fourth song in Oceania.

Tour dates

Cancelled dates

Personnel 
 Paul Stanley – vocals, rhythm guitar
 Gene Simmons – vocals, bass
 Ace Frehley – lead guitar, vocals
 Eric Carr – drums, vocals

References

Sources

Kiss (band) concert tours
1980 concert tours